Harpalus vanemdeni is a species of ground beetle in the subfamily Harpalinae. It was described by Schauberger in 1932.

References

vanemdeni
Beetles described in 1932